Jan Jacek Ogiński (1619 - 24 February 1684, Krakow) was a nobleman, commander and statesman of the Grand Duchy of Lithuania. He was also known as Jan Samuelewicz Ogiński. He served as hetman of Lithuania from 1682 to 1684, an office also later held by the youngest of Jan's four sons, Grzegorz Antoni Ogiński.

Sources (in Polish)
http://ipsb.tymczasowylink.pl/index.php/a/jan-jacek-oginski-h-wlasnego
Leszek A, Wierzbicki, Akt konfederacji wojska litewskiego zawiązanej w Kobryniu 22 listopada 1672 roku, w: Res Historica, t. 21, Lublin 2005, s. 137.
2.Skocz do góry ↑ Volumina Legum, t. V, Petersburg 1860, s. 162.

1619 births
1684 deaths
Field Hetmans of the Grand Duchy of Lithuania

Ogiński family